Caught in a Mosh: BBC Live in Concert is a live album released by the American heavy metal band Anthrax on January 22, 2007, internationally and on November 10, 2009, in the United States. It contains Anthrax's February 15, 1987, show at the Hammersmith Odeon in London (disc 1), as well as their performance at the Monsters of Rock festival at Castle Donington on August 22, 1987, (disc 2).

Track listing 

Recorded live at the Hammersmith Odeon on February 15, 1987

Recorded live at Donington on August 22, 1987

Personnel 
 Joey Belladonna – lead vocals
 Dan Spitz – lead guitar, backing vocals
 Scott Ian – rhythm guitar, backing vocals
 Frank Bello – bass guitar, backing vocals
 Charlie Benante – drums

References 

Anthrax (American band) live albums
2007 live albums
Island Records live albums
Universal Music Group live albums
Albums recorded at the Hammersmith Apollo